John Murtagh Macrossan (1832 – 30 March 1891) was an Australian politician of the late 19th century in the parliament of Queensland.

Early and parliamentary life
Macrossan was born in Donegal, Ireland.  He moved to the colony of Victoria at the age of 21 to work on the gold diggings.  Twelve years later he moved to North Queensland where he became well known among the miners in 1873 was elected a member of the Queensland Legislative Assembly for the Kennedy electoral district.  He championed the causes of regulation of the mining industry and Separatism of North Queensland as a separate colony.  From January 1879 he was member for Townsville and secretary for public works and for mines in the first and second McIlwraith Ministries.  In January 1890 Macrossan became the Colonial Secretary in the Morehead government.

Mining
In the first McIlwraith Ministry, Macrossan successfully introduced the first mining regulations in Queensland on his third attempt in 1881.  In 1889 Macrossan expanded upon this success by introducing new regulations which included provisions for a system of inspections by representatives of the miners.

Self-government of northern Queensland and Australian Federation
After advocating on the issue for many years, in October 1890 Macrossan brought forward a motion to bring about the separation of the north. Then Premier Samuel Griffith moved an amendment that it was desirable to have separate legislative authorities in southern, northern and central Queensland, which was carried. However, in the 1890s Regionalism became less of a focus as Federalism became closer to attainment. In February 1890 Macrossan attended the conference on federation held at Melbourne with Griffith, who was then leader of the opposition, and in 1891 he was one of the Queensland representatives to the first Constitutional Convention.

Four weeks after the conference opened he died, on 30 March 1891. Following a funeral at St Stephen's Cathedral, Macrossan was buried in Nudgee Cemetery.

References

 Waterson, Duncan Bruce: Biographical Register of the Queensland Parliament 1860–1929 (second edition), Sydney 2001.
 Joyce R.B. & Murphy, D.J.(Ed.): Queensland Political Portraits, St Lucia (University of Queensland Press), 1978.
 

1832 births
1891 deaths
People from North Queensland
History of Queensland
Members of the Queensland Legislative Assembly
Politicians from County Donegal
Australian people of Irish descent
19th-century Australian politicians